Kpabia is a small town in the Yendi Municipal district, a district in the Northern Region of north Ghana.

References

Populated places in the Northern Region (Ghana)